Ylva Hjördis Sofia Nowén (born 5 January 1970 in Östersund) is a Swedish former alpine skier who competed in the 1992, 1994, 1998 and 2002 Winter Olympics.

She won the overall slalom World Cup during the 1997–1998 season.

World Cup competition victories

Olympic results

References

External links
 sports-reference.com

1970 births
Swedish female alpine skiers
Alpine skiers at the 1992 Winter Olympics
Alpine skiers at the 1994 Winter Olympics
Alpine skiers at the 1998 Winter Olympics
Alpine skiers at the 2002 Winter Olympics
Olympic alpine skiers of Sweden
FIS Alpine Ski World Cup champions
People from Östersund
Living people
Sportspeople from Jämtland County